Kabaret is the eighth studio album by French singer Patricia Kaas. It was first released digitally on 15 December 2008. The physical release followed in Switzerland, Belgium, Germany and Russia on 6 February 2009, and in a double CD edition in France on 30 March 2009.

Kabaret, written with a K, like Kaas and the German term Kabarett, is a tribute to the 1930 decade, the sparkling entertainers like Greta Garbo, Suzy Solidor, Martha Graham and others.

The song "Une derniére fois" was written by Kaas, and is therefore her first ever solo written song.

With all-time partner Fred Helbert, Kaas arranged the songs "Le jour se lève", "Et s'il fallait le faire" and "Falling in Love Again."

Track listing

Charts and certifications

Weekly charts

Certifications and sales

Release history

References

2008 albums
Patricia Kaas albums